Activated protein C–protein C inhibitor (APC-PCI) is a complex of activated protein C (APC) and protein C inhibitor (PCI). It has been measured in coagulation testing to evaluate coagulation, thrombosis, and other cardiovascular complications. It is a marker of thrombin generation and indicates hypercoagulability. The half-life of APC-PCI is either 40 minutes or 140minutes.

Ethinylestradiol-containing birth control pills have been found to increase levels of APC-PCI to a similar degree as thrombin–antithrombin complex (TAT) and to a greater extent than D-dimer. However, only APC-PCI was able to differentiate between a second- and third-generation birth control pill.

Another complex related to APC-PCI is the activated protein C–α1-antitrypsin (APCAT) complex.

References

Coagulation system
Protein complexes